Whales and Leeches is the second album by the American stoner metal band Red Fang, released in 2013 on Relapse Records.

Track listing

Critical reception

There was a high level of critical reception for the album, with reviews varying from mixed to positive.

Quietus felt that the album was appreciable by a broad audience with its catchy refrains but was repetitive and lacked the substance of the band's prior works.

Punknews was slightly positive, again raising concerns that certain songs were repetitive. However Blood Like Cream was exulted as their catchiest song to date. Overall, the reviewer notes that though the album is indistinguishable from others in the genre, for those who like "loud sludgy riffs, face-melting solos and Ozzy-esque vocal hooks, Red Fang will satisfy your appetite".

Exclaim! had mostly positive comments on the album, stating that though similar in nature to their prior music, the music was a major refinement on prior efforts, to form a particularly aggressive variation of stoner rock.

AllMusic reported positively, feeling that Red Fang had managed to operate on two levels with the release, managing "to get psychedelic without abandoning the non-stop riff-fests that made their first two albums such a welcome change of pace". In doing so, it was rated with other successful stand outs of the genre for retaining quality while adding complexity, coupled with being suitable for a wider range of audiences.

Pitchfork had mixed or negative analysis of the album. While the technical competence of Red Fang were appreciated, an absence of substance in the music, coupled with extreme repetitiveness, was felt to make the album difficult going and unsuitable for repeat listening.

Personnel
Red Fang
 Aaron Beam – bass, vocals, additional guitars, production
 Maurice Bryan Giles – guitars, vocals, production
 David Sullivan – guitars, production
 John Sherman – drums, production

Additional musicians
Roger Joseph Manning Jr. – keyboards, piano, and synthesizer on "Crows in Swine"
 Mike Scheidt – vocals on "Dawn Rising"
 Pall Jenkins – vocals and musical saw on "Every Little Twist"

Production personnel
 Chris Funk – production, engineering, organ, synthesizer, tambourine
 Graeme Gibson – engineering
 Adam Selzer – engineering
 Vance Powell – mixing
 Eddie Spear – mixing assistant
 Pete Lyman – mastering
 Orion Landau – artwork, layout

References

2013 albums
Red Fang albums
Relapse Records albums